
Gmina Janów is a rural gmina (administrative district) in Częstochowa County, Silesian Voivodeship, in southern Poland.

The gmina contains part of the protected area called Eagle Nests Landscape Park.

Villages
Gmina Janów contains the villages and settlements of Apolonka, Bystrzanowice, Bystrzanowice-Dwór, Czepurka, Góry Gorzkowskie, Hucisko, Janów, Lgoczanka, Lipnik, Lusławice, Okrąglik, Pabianice, Piasek, Ponik, Siedlec, Skowronów, Śmiertny Dąb, Sokole Pole, Teodorów, Zagórze, Złoty Potok and Żuraw.

Neighbouring gminas
Gmina Janów is bordered by the gminas of Lelów, Mstów, Niegowa, Olsztyn, Przyrów and Żarki.

References

Janow
Częstochowa County